How Google Works is a book co-written by Google's Executive Chairman and ex-CEO Eric Schmidt and former SVP of Products Jonathan Rosenberg. The authors explain how technology has shifted the balance of power from companies to consumers and make the argument that the only way to succeed in this ever-changing landscape is to create superior products and attract a new breed of multifaceted employees, dubbed "smart creatives". The book is in English and was published on 23 September 2014 by Grand Central Publishing, a division of Hachette Book Group. The hardcover version is 304 pages in length. Covering various topics such as corporate culture, strategy, talent, decision-making, communication, innovation, and dealing with disruption, the authors illustrate management maxims with numerous insider anecdotes from Google's history. It became a New York Times bestseller.

Further reading
How Google Works - Book summary
Review from The Guardian

2014 non-fiction books
Books about Google
Books by computer and internet entrepreneurs
Grand Central Publishing books